The Alfa Romeo 50 was an Italian truck produced by Alfa Romeo from 1931 to 1934. The company created the truck  in partnership with Büssing. A replacement did not arrived until 1940, with the introduction of the Alfa Romeo 800/900 series of trucks.

Technical characteristics
The truck can draw trailer of 14t in its most common version.

The Alfa Romeo 50 had a 10.6 litre, 6 cylinder diesel engine rated  at 1200 rpm.

Production
115 units were produced.

References 

Alfa Romeo 050
Vehicles introduced in 1931